Nicolò Zeno was one of a dozen s built for the  (Royal Italian Navy) in the late 1920s. Completed in 1930, she served in World War II.

Design and description
Their complement during wartime was 222–225 officers and enlisted men.

The Navigatoris were powered by two Belluzzo geared steam turbines, each driving one propeller shaft using steam supplied by four Yarrow boilers.

Their main battery consisted of six  guns in three twin-gun turrets, one each fore and aft of the superstructure and the third amidships. Anti-aircraft (AA) defense for the Navigatori-class ships was provided by a pair of  AA guns in single mounts abreast the forward funnel and a pair of twin-gun mounts for  machine guns. They were equipped with six  torpedo tubes in two triple mounts amidships. The Navigatoris could carry 86–104 mines.

Construction and career
Nicolò Zeno was laid down by Cantieri navali del Quarnaro at their Fiume shipyard on 5 June 1927, launched on 12 August 1928 and commissioned on 27 May 1930.

Citations

Bibliography

External links
 Nicolò Zeno Marina Militare website

Navigatori-class destroyers
Ships built in Fiume
1928 ships
World War II destroyers of Italy
Maritime incidents in September 1943